Mit Okba Stadium  is a multi-purpose stadium in Giza, Egypt.  It is currently used mostly for football matches and hosts the home games of Tersana SC.  The stadium holds 15,000 people.

References

Football venues in Egypt
Buildings and structures in Giza
Sport in Giza
Multi-purpose stadiums in Egypt